The 2004 FAI Cup Final was the deciding match of the 2004 FAI Cup. Defending champions Longford Town contested the final against Waterford United. The match was played at Lansdowne Road in Dublin. Longford won the match 2–1.

References

2004
Fai Cup Final 2004
Fai Cup Final 2004
Final
FAI Cup Final, 2004
FAI Cup Final